Ypsolopha longa is a moth of the family Ypsolophidae. It is known from Japan, Korea and Russia.

The wingspan is 22–31 mm.

The larvae feed on Euonymus maackii and Euonymus sieboldianus.

References

Ypsolophidae
Moths of Asia